La Veille, or La Veille Place, is a historic home located at Mutual, Calvert County, Maryland, United States. It is a -story gambrel-roofed brick house, of Flemish bond construction. A number of early-19th-century outbuildings include: a log corn crib, three barns (one of which still houses its 19th-century tobacco prise equipment), several small sheds, and a frame house that was created by the joining of two 18th-century log slave quarters. Between the "Quarters" and the main house is the La Veille family cemetery, enclosed within an elaborate late-19th-century wrought iron fence.

La Veille was listed on the National Register of Historic Places in 1973.

References

External links
, including photo from 1977, at Maryland Historical Trust

Houses on the National Register of Historic Places in Maryland
Houses in Calvert County, Maryland
National Register of Historic Places in Calvert County, Maryland
Slave cabins and quarters in the United States